The American Athletic Conference first sponsored football in 2013. This is a list of its annual standings since establishment.

Standings

References

American Athletic Conference
Standings